This is a list of sculptures by Tony Smith, most of which are installed outdoors.  While Smith made many artworks in a variety of media and his work as an architectural designer, he is widely known for his sculptures, which range from the small to monumental scale.  No complete inventory has been published that identifies the current location of all of these works, but in the 1990s Save Outdoor Sculpture! (SOS!) participants completed an inventory and assessment of 83 of these sculptures.

References

 
Lists of sculptures